Darren W. Woods (born 1964/65) is an American businessman who is the chief executive officer (CEO) and chairman of ExxonMobil since January 1, 2017.

Early life and education
Woods was born in Wichita, Kansas. He earned a bachelor's degree in electrical engineering from Texas A&M University, followed by an MBA from Northwestern's Kellogg School of Management.

Career

ExxonMobil
Woods joined Exxon in 1992. He had worked for Exxon for 24 years prior to being promoted to CEO following Rex Tillerson's nomination by President Donald Trump to be the next United States Secretary of State. While his predecessor was involved in deal making and exploration, Woods is a veteran of the refining side of the oil business. Prior to becoming CEO, Woods ran the refining and chemical divisions of the company, which delivered the majority of ExxonMobil's $7.8 billion net income in 2016.

At an investor meeting in New York in 2017, Woods outlined his growth plan including drilling in the Permian Basin of Texas and New Mexico and the Bakken shale formation in North Dakota. He also spoke briefly about the company's operations in Russia, expressing an optimistic outlook regarding Exxon's Sakhalin project on Russia's eastern coast.

Woods has said that the combination of horizontal drilling and hydraulic fracturing has "shattered the Peak Oil myth". Woods has publicly endorsed the Paris climate accord. The accord commits nations to cutting greenhouse gas emissions. In May 2017, Woods wrote a personal letter to President Trump to urge that the U.S. remain a party to the agreement. He says that by remaining a party to the accords the U.S. will have a seat at the table to "ensure a level playing field" and support "the most cost-effective greenhouse gas reduction options".

On October 5, 2020, Bloomberg News reported that Exxon was set to increase its annual carbon emissions by about 17%, or about as much as the annual output of Greece. The emissions expansion would be built off an investment plan reportedly signed off by Woods. Exxon said its internal projections are "a preliminary, internal assessment of estimated cumulative emission growth through 2025 and did not include the [additional] mitigation and abatement measures that would have been evaluated in the planning process. Furthermore, the projections identified in the leaked documents have significantly changed, a fact that was not fully explained or prominently featured in the article."

In 2022, Woods was named one of the US' top 'climate villains' by The Guardian after "Exxon lobbyists were captured on video revealing the company’s efforts to obstruct climate legislation in Congress."

Accusation of lying to Congress
In 2021, Woods denied that Exxon had covered up its own research about Big Oil's contribution to the climate crisis. The chair of the Congressional committee taking Woods' testimony likened Woods' denial to the decades' long lies by the American tobacco industry denying that nicotine is addictive. Woods also declined to make a pledge to stop lobbying against  climate initiatives.

References

1960s births
Living people
Businesspeople from Kansas
Directors of ExxonMobil
Kellogg School of Management alumni
People from Wichita, Kansas
Texas A&M University alumni
American chief executives of Fortune 500 companies